Dewevrella is a genus of plants first described in 1907. It contains only one known species, Dewevrella cochliostema, native to central Africa (Gabon, Republic of Congo, Democratic Republic of the Congo).

A second species, Dewevrella congensis Wernham, was described in 1920, based on a type specimen consisting of only a few twigs. Status and placement of this name remain unresolved.

References

Monotypic Apocynaceae genera
Flora of Africa
Baisseeae
Taxa named by Émile Auguste Joseph De Wildeman